Yugbhushan Suri(born 26 October 1957) born as Naveen Khimji Mota is a Jain acharya of Shwetamber tradition.

He holds, along with 31 other monks, the highest rank in Jaina order and as the heir of Tirthankara Mahavir Swami he is the 79th successor in the lineage of Ganadhara Sudharma Swami after his coronation as Gachhadhipati of Muni Mohjit Vijayji Samuday on 4 February 2020.

On 21 February 2021 celebration and felicitation function was held at Mumbai upon his 1st anniversary of coronation as Spiritual Sovereign also known as Gachhadhipati amongst Jain followers.

Early life 
He is a disciple of Acharya Ramchandrasuri and was initiated into monkhood on 29 April 1979 along with his elder brother Muni Mohjit Vijayji.

He was appointed to Acharya position at Deolali  on 23 April 2008.

Career 
Yugbhushan Suri leads Jyot, an organization spreading Jainism. He gave the concept to Jyot for films like Chal Man Jeetva Jaiye, an urban Gujarati morality drama, and Ek Cheez Milegi Wonderful, a scientific and philosophical movie.

In 2017, under the guidance of Yugbhushan Suri, a 50-foot tall 3D image projection of Jain Lord Mahavira emerging from Sabarmati River was organised on the evening of birth anniversary of Mahavira Swami.

Yugbhushan Suri led the Shikharji Movement, 2018 against Jharkhand government's project related to the development of commercial infrastructure on the hill of Shikharji. The hill is considered sacred by all Jain sects. He is concerned about government's effects on all religions and often supports agitations based on the sanctity of religious places.
Jain Acharya's open letter to CJI elaborately juxtaposes the position of Indian religions vis-a-vis western religions showing his deep concern for pride of Indian religions.

He also urges to get particular definition on religious rights as right to privacy, equality and freedom of speech and expression had been significantly expanded.

References 

21st-century Indian Jains
21st-century Jain monks
Living people
1957 births